Čermák (feminine Čermáková) is a Czech surname. Notable people with the surname include:

 Adrián Čermák, Slovak footballer
 Aleš Čermák, Czech footballer
 Anton Cermak (1873–1933), mayor of Chicago, Illinois
 Dragutin Čermak (1944–2021), Serbian basketball player and coach
 Evžen Čermák (1932–2018), Czech alpine skier
 František Čermák (born 1976), Czech tennis player
 František Čermák (painter), Czech painter
 František Čermák (sport shooter), Czech sport shooter
 Jaroslav Čermák (1929–2011), member of the French Resistance
 Jaroslav Čermák (1831–1878), Czech painter
 Jiřina Čermáková (1944–2019), Czech field hockey player
 Karl Čermak (1888–1924), German Bohemian and Czechoslovak politician
 Leokadia Makarska-Čermák, Polish painter and designer
 Leoš Čermák (born 1978), Czech ice hockey player
 Marcel Čermák, Czech footballer
 Miloslav Čermák (born 1986), Czech ice hockey player
 Pavel Čermák (born 1989), Czech footballer
 Petr Čermák (born 1942), Czech rower
 Tomáš Čermák (born 1943), Czech engineer, rector of the Technical University of Ostrava
 Vladimír Čermák (1929–2004), Czech philosopher, politologist, lawyer and judge

See also
 

Czech-language surnames